Rasmus Rasmussen may refer to:

 Rasmus Rasmussen (actor) (1862–1932), Norwegian actor, folk singer and theatre director
 Rasmus Rasmussen (merchant) (1850–1921), American merchant and businessman
 Rasmus Rasmussen (gymnast) (1899–1974), Danish gymnast
 Rasmus Rasmussen (writer) (1871–1962), Faroese folk high school teacher, writer, and independence activist